Dunya Kamran Khan Kay Sath ( lit. World with Kamran Khan) is a television current affairs talk show on Dunya News. 
It is one of the most watched and influential current affairs shows on Pakistan's Dunya News TV channel.  The program is hosted by Pakistan's renowned investigative journalist, Kamran Khan. Mr Khan has been part of the country's media industry for 34 years.
His show tries to untangle the twists and turns of Pakistani politics, social and economic issues.  
The program covers major national, regional and international stories through a combination of high-profile interviews, special reports, commentary and analysis.
It is broadcast live from Karachi from 9:30 to 11:00 pm, Monday to Friday.

Background

The show was launched on 3 August 2015. It is the resumption of the Aaj Kamran Khan Kay Sath, which was discontinued when Kamran Khan left Geo News and joined the BOL Network as President and Editor-in-Chief. Following the Axact scam, he resigned from the post and following the collapse BOL even before it was launched, Mr Khan joined Dunya Media Group as President and Editor-in-Chief. Dunya Media Group. The show while relatively new, has garnered significant attention and is now one of the standard bastions of trusted news.

Format
The show follows the traditional anchor driven model of late night television talk shows. Kamran Khan, utilizing the skills learnt from decades in the news media, creates a verbose yet approachable narrative and in doing so deftly articulates viewpoints on current affairs in an understandable manner. This is then followed by a more in-depth investigation into the issue at hand, and usually individuals involved in the topic at hand are brought in for their views on the topic.

Anchor

Kamran Khan holds numerous achievements in his decades long stint as journalist and media person. He has served as reporter to numerous international newspapers, such as The Sunday Times and the Washington Post. 
He is known for his close placement to many events in Pakistani history, from the state's first conducted nuclear tests, to the Daniel Pearl saga, and beyond.

References 

Pakistani television talk shows
Dunya News original programming